Aliabad-e Duleh Rash (also Romanized as ‘Alīābād-e Dūleh Rash; also known as ‘Alīābād) is a village in Saral Rural District, Saral District, Divandarreh County, Kurdistan Province, Iran. At the 2006 census, its population was 118, in 23 families. The village is populated by Kurds.

References 

Towns and villages in Divandarreh County
Kurdish settlements in Kurdistan Province